Silas Daniel Satonho best known as Dany (born 14 January 1990) is an Angolan footballer who plays as a midfielder for Petro de Luanda. He is also a member of the Angola national team.

In 2019, he transferred from Interclube to Kabuscorp in midseason.

In 2019-20, he signed in for Petro de Luanda in the Angolan league, the Girabola.

References

External
 
 

1990 births
Angolan footballers
Association football midfielders
Living people
Kategoria Superiore players
Expatriate footballers in Albania
Angolan expatriate footballers
Angolan expatriate sportspeople in Albania
Atlético Petróleos de Luanda players
G.D. Interclube players
Kabuscorp S.C.P. players
Angola international footballers
2016 African Nations Championship players
Angola A' international footballers